Wusheng County is a county of Sichuan Province, China, bordering Chongqing to the south. It is locates in the southwest of the prefecture-level city of Guang'an and is its westernmost county-level division.

Climate

References

County-level divisions of Sichuan